Moorhouse or Laxton Moorhouse is a hamlet within the Laxton and Moorhouse parish, in the Newark and Sherwood district of central Nottinghamshire, England.

Toponymy 
The name Moorhouse was a local name meaning the inhabitant at the house on the moorland. Known as Morhus by 1231, it derived from elements of the Old English words mor, meaning marsh or fen, and hus, meaning house. Later interpretations included Morhuses in 1232, and through local association Laxton (or Lexington) Morehouse by 1324.

Geography 
The area is 2 miles east of Laxton, and 20 miles northeast of Nottingham. Predominantly, it is a scattering of farms, farmhouses and cottages amongst a wider rural setting. These are grouped around three roads meeting by a single junction: Green Lane, Moorhouse Lane, and Ossington Lane.

In 2011 the population of Laxton, Moorhouse and the adjoining Ompton and Ossington parishes was 449.

The Moorhouse Beck stream runs through the village, rising from several locations in the south of the parish.

History 
The Moorhouse area changed hands several times throughout the years, William The Conqueror granting the manor first to Geoffrey Alselin in 1066. Sir William Courten was a later owner who commissioned a survey of the Laxton and Moorhouse lands, with cartographer Mark Pierce drafting for him a well-regarded 1635 map demonstrating extensive use of the open field system. Moorhouse was partially within an 'East Field' and mainly located within the 'North Field', with some of those inhabitants also farming the South Field at Laxton.

The fields around Moorhouse were eventually enclosed from 1860 through the Moorhouse Enclosure Act, with much of the property under the John Denison Ossington Estate by the turn of the 20th century. The ownership of the rest was shared with the Earl of Scarborough, and Earl Manvers Pierrepont family notably on Church Farm until 1950 when the 6th Earl sold it to their tenants. Most of the Laxton manor was sold to the Ministry of Agriculture in 1952, with a further sale to the Crown Estate in 1981, it was sold back to the Earl Manvers Thoresby Estate in 2020.

As well as the Moorhouse chapel, there was also a small Methodist chapel which has been unused as such in recent times.

In 1990, the Laxton parish name was changed to include Moorhouse.

Economy 
Farming is the key industry with much of the available land and buildings used to support this activity.

There is a bed and breakfast facility at a 17th-century cottage within the village.

Metal fabrication services are also provided for locally.

Landmarks

Moorhouse Chapel 
The Moorhouse Chantry Chapel is a key feature in the area, just north east of the road junction. It is dedicated to St. Nicholas, and was erected in 1861 using a Gothic style, by John Evelyn Denison of nearby Ossington Hall who was a local landowner. It is believed that there was an original chapel on the same site built for the private use of Robert de Lexington early in the thirteenth century, with the bell being reused in the replacement church.

Listed buildings 
As well as the church (Grade II*), there are two other listed buildings (Grade II) within the village:

 Church Farmhouse on Church Lane
 Aggrie House on Green Lane

References

External links 
 Laxton & Moorhouse Parish Council

Hamlets in Nottinghamshire
Newark and Sherwood